Hans-Jürgen Pfohe (born 23 September 1950) is a German former sailor. He competed in the Tornado event at the 1988 Summer Olympics. In 1987, along with Roland Gäbler, they were the German national champions in the event.

References

External links
 

1950 births
Living people
German male sailors (sport)
Olympic sailors of West Germany
Sailors at the 1988 Summer Olympics – Tornado
People from Lüneburg
Sportspeople from Lower Saxony